Malachim was an alphabet published by Heinrich Cornelius Agrippa in the 16th century. Other alphabets with a similar origin are the Celestial Alphabet and Transitus Fluvii.

"Malachim" is a plural form from Hebrew (מלאך, mal'ach) and means "angels" or "messengers", see Angels in Judaism.

History 
The Malachim alphabet is derived from the Hebrew and Greek alphabets. It was created by Heinrich Cornelius Agrippa in the 16th century. It is still used by high degree Freemasons to a limited extent.

Alphabet
This version of the alphabet is from Agrippa's Of Occult Philosophy, 1651 edition.

References

Artificial scripts used in mysticism
Language and mysticism
Writing systems introduced in the 16th century
1510 in Europe
1510 beginnings